The 1939–40 Nemzeti Bajnokság I was contested by 14 teams, and Ferencvárosi TC won the championship.

League standings

Results

References
Hungary - List of final tables (RSSSF)

Nemzeti Bajnokság I seasons
Hun
1939–40 in Hungarian football